Back Street Crawler is the debut studio album by English guitarist Paul Kossoff, released in 1973; the same year Kossoff's band Free disbanded, Kossoff was able to moderate his drug addiction to record the album, which featured contributions from his former Free bandmates as well as Yes drummer Alan White.

"Molten Gold" is not, as has been alleged, a reunion of the original Free line-up (Kossoff, Paul Rodgers, Andy Fraser, Simon Kirke); it is an outtake from the 1972 Free album Free at Last, with overdubs.

"Time Away" features three-fifths of the Mk II Free line-up (Kossoff, Kirke, Tetsu Yamauchi), along with singer-songwriter-guitarist John Martyn, who would in 1975 invite Kossoff to guest on his own tour; this collaboration can be heard on expanded editions of Martyn's Live at Leeds album.

Track listing

Original release, 1973

Deluxe edition, 2008

Personnel 
 Paul Kossoff – lead guitar
 Trevor Burton – bass ("Tuesday Morning")
 Alan White – drums ("Tuesday Morning", "I'm Ready")
 John "Rabbit" Bundrick – keyboards ("Tuesday Morning"); organ, chimes, piano ("Molten Gold")
 Alan Spenner – bass ("I'm Ready")
 Jean Roussel – keyboards ("I'm Ready", "Back Street Crawler (Don't Need You No More)")
 Jess Roden – lead vocals ("I'm Ready"); harmony vocals ("Molten Gold")
 Tetsu Yamauchi – bass ("Time Away")
 Simon Kirke – drums ("Time Away", "Molten Gold")
 John Martyn – lead vocals, guitar ("May You Never"); guitar ("Time Away", "Leslie Jam")
 Paul Rodgers – lead vocals ("Molten Gold")
 Andy Fraser – bass ("Molten Gold")
 Conrad Isidore – drums ("Back Street Crawler (Don't Need You No More)")
 Clive Chaman – bass ("Back Street Crawler (Don't Need You No More)")

Production 
 All songs produced by Paul Kossoff
 "Time Away" and "Molten Gold" co-produced by Bob Potter
 "Back Street Crawler (Don't Need You No More)" co-produced by Richard "Diga" Digby Smith and Jean Roussel
 "Tuesday Morning" and "Back Street Crawler (Don't Need You No More)" engineered by Richard "Diga" Digby Smith
 "I'm Ready" and "Molten Gold" engineered by Bob Potter
 "Time Away" engineered by Tony Platt

References 

Paul Kossoff albums
1973 albums
Island Records albums
Albums produced by Paul Kossoff